Marco João Costa Baixinho (born 11 July 1989) is a Portuguese professional footballer who plays mainly as a central defender for Cypriot club Anorthosis Famagusta.

Club career
Born in Arruda dos Vinhos, Lisbon District, Baixinho spent most of his youth career at Sporting CP and briefly rivals S.L. Benfica. He made his senior debut with A.D. Carregado in the third division in the 2008–09 season, winning promotion and then making his professional debut in the second, suffering instant relegation.

In the summer of 2011, Baixinho joined C.D. Mafra also of the third tier. On 23 June 2015, after four seasons of regular game time concluding with winning the title, he signed a two-year deal at Primeira Liga club F.C. Paços de Ferreira under his former Mafra manager Jorge Simão.

Baixinho extended his contract in January 2016, to last until July 2019. He scored his first top-flight goal on 5 December that year, opening a 2–1 home win over Boavista F.C. while playing in defensive midfield. After Paços were relegated in 2018, he netted four times to help them bounce back as champions (five in all competitions) and then signed a new deal in June 2019.

At the end of the 2021–22 campaign, having failed to agree terms for a new deal, the 33-year-old Baixinho left the Estádio da Mata Real. On 13 July 2022, he signed a two-year contract with Anorthosis Famagusta F.C. of the Cypriot First Division.

Career statistics

Honours
Mafra
Campeonato Nacional de Seniores: 2014–15

Paços Ferreira
LigaPro: 2018–19

References

External links

1989 births
Living people
Sportspeople from Lisbon District
Portuguese footballers
Association football defenders
Primeira Liga players
Liga Portugal 2 players
Segunda Divisão players
C.D. Mafra players
F.C. Paços de Ferreira players
Cypriot First Division players
Anorthosis Famagusta F.C. players
Portuguese expatriate footballers
Expatriate footballers in Cyprus
Portuguese expatriate sportspeople in Cyprus